The Enterprise-class frigates were the final class of 28-gun sailing frigates of the sixth-rate to be produced for the Royal Navy. These twenty-seven vessels were designed in 1770 by John Williams. A first batch of five ships were ordered as part of the programme sparked by the Falklands Islands emergency. Two ships were built by contract in private shipyards, while three others were constructed in the Royal Dockyards using foreign oak.

A second batch of fifteen ships were ordered in 1776 to 1778 to meet the exigencies of the North American situation, and a final group of seven ships followed in 1782 to 1783 with only some minor modifications to include side gangways running flush with the quarter deck and forecastle, and with solid bulkheads along the quarterdeck.

Ships in class 
First batch
 Siren
 Ordered: 25 December 1770
 Built by:  John Henniker and Company, Chatham.
 Keel laid:  April 1771
 Launched:  2 November 1773
 Completed:  5 October 1775 at Chatham Royal Dockyard.
 Fate:  Grounded and abandoned under fire off Point Judith, Connecticut on 6 November 1777.
 Fox
 Ordered: 25 December 1770
 Built by:  Thomas Raymond, Northam (Southampton).
 Keel laid: May 1771
 Launched:  2 September 1773
 Completed:  12 February 1776 at Portsmouth Royal Dockyard.
 Fate:  Captured by the French off Brest on 11 September 1778.
 Surprise
 Ordered: January 1771
 Built by:  Woolwich Royal Dockyard.
 Keel laid:  5 September 1771
 Launched:  13 April 1774
 Completed:  15 April 1775
 Fate:  Sold at Woolwich Dockyard on 24 April 1783.
 Enterprise
 Ordered: January 1771
 Built by: Deptford Royal Dockyard.
 Keel laid:  9 September 1771
 Launched:  24 August 1774
 Completed:  20 June 1775
 Fate:  Taken to pieces at Deptford Dockyard in August 1807.
 Actaeon
 Ordered: 5 November 1771
 Built by: Woolwich Royal Dockyard.
 Keel laid:  October 1772
 Launched:  18 April 1775
 Completed:  3 August 1775
 Fate:  Grounded off Fort Sullivan, South Carolina and burnt to avoid capture on 29 June 1776.

Second batch
 Proserpine
 Ordered: 14 May 1776
 Built by:  John Barnard, Harwich.
 Keel laid: June 1776
 Launched:  7 July 1777
 Completed:  23 September 1777 at Sheerness Dockyard.
 Fate:  Wrecked in the Elbe Estuary on 1 February 1799.
 Medea
 Ordered: 14 May 1776
 Built by:  James Martin Hillhouse, Bristol.
 Keel laid: June 1776
 Launched:  28 April 1778
 Completed:  15 September 1778 at Plymouth Dockyard.
 Fate:  Fitted as hospital ship 1801.  Sold 1805.
 Andromeda
 Ordered: 14 May 1776
 Built by:  Robert Fabian, East Cowes.
 Keel laid: July 1776
 Launched:  18 November 1777
 Completed:  28 January 1778 at Portsmouth Dockyard.
 Fate:  Lost with all hands in a hurricane off Martinique on 11 October 1780.
 Aurora
 Ordered: 3 July 1776
 Built by:  John Perry & Company, Blackwall.
 Keel laid: July 1776
 Launched:  7 June 1777
 Completed:  9 August 1777 at Woolwich Dockyard.
 Fate:  Sold at Chatham on 3 November 1814.
 Sibyl
 Ordered: 24 July 1776
 Built by:  Henry Adams, Bucklers Hard.
 Keel laid: 10 December 1776
 Launched:  2 January 1779
 Completed:  13 March 1779 at Portsmouth Dockyard.
 Fate:  Wrecked off Madagascar on 26 July 1798.
 Brilliant
 Ordered: 9 October 1776
 Built by:  Henry Adams, Bucklers Hard.
 Keel laid: February 1777
 Launched:  15 July 1779
 Completed:  4 September 1779 at Portsmouth Dockyard.
 Fate:  Taken to pieces at Portsmouth Dockyard in November 1811.
 Pomona
 Ordered: 7 March 1777
 Built by:  Thomas Raymond, Chapel (Southampton).
 Keel laid: 8 May 1777
 Launched:  22 September 1778
 Completed:  17 December 1778 at Portsmouth Dockyard.
 Fate:  Taken to pieces at Portsmouth Dockyard in August 1811.
 Crescent
 Ordered: 19 July 1777
 Built by:  James Martin Hillhouse, Bristol.
 Keel laid: 19 August 1777
 Launched:  March 1779
 Completed:  30 June 1779 at Plymouth Dockyard.
 Fate:  Captured by the French on 19 June 1781.
 Nemesis
 Ordered: 30 September 1777
 Built by:  Jolly, Leathers & Barton, Liverpool.
 Keel laid: November 1777
 Launched:  23 January 1780
 Completed:  22 June 1780 at Plymouth Dockyard.
 Fate:  Sold for breaking up at Plymouth Dockyard on 9 June 1814.
 Resource
 Ordered: 30 September 1777
 Built by:  John Randall & Company, Rotherhithe.
 Keel laid: November 1777
 Launched:  10 August 1778
 Completed:  2 October 1778 at Deptford Dockyard.
 Fate:  Renamed Enterprise on 17 April 1806.  Sold at Deptford Dockyard on 28 August 1816.
 Mercury
 Ordered: 22 January 1778
 Built by:  Peter Mestaer, Rotherhithe.
 Keel laid: 25 March 1778
 Launched:  9 December 1779
 Completed:  24 February 1780 at Deptford Dockyard.
 Fate:  Taken to pieces at Woolwich Dockyard in January 1814.
 Pegasus
 Ordered: 21 February 1778
 Built by:  Deptford Dockyard.
 Keel laid: 20 June 1778
 Launched:  1 June 1779
 Completed:  20 July 1779.
 Fate:  Sold at Deptford Dockyard to break up on 28 August 1816.
 Cyclops
 Ordered: 6 March 1778
 Built by:  James Menetone & Son, Limehouse.
 Keel laid: 3 April 1778
 Launched:  31 July 1779
 Completed:  26 September 1779 at Deptford Dockyard.
 Fate:  Sold at Portsmouth Dockyard on 1 September 1814.
 Vestal
 Ordered: 18 March 1778
 Built by:  Robert & John Batson, Limehouse.
 Keel laid: 1 May 1778
 Launched:  24 December 1779
 Completed:  25 February 1780 at Deptford Dockyard.
 Fate:  Sold at Barbados in February 1816.
 Laurel
 Ordered: 30 April 1778
 Built by:  Thomas Raymond, Chapel (Southampton).
 Keel laid: 3 June 1778
 Launched:  27 October 1779
 Completed:  4 January 1780 at Portsmouth Dockyard.
 Fate:  Wrecked in a hurricane off Martinique on 11 October 1780.
Third batch
 Thisbe
 Ordered: 23 February 1782
 Built by: Thomas King, Dover.
 Keel laid:  September 1782
 Launched:  25 November 1783
 Completed:  19 April 1784 at Deptford Dockyard.
 Fate: Sold to be broken up, 9 August 1815.
 Circe
 Ordered: 6 March 1782
 Built by: Henry Ladd, Dover.
 Keel laid:  December 1782
 Launched:  30 September 1785
 Completed:  2 November 1790 at Woolwich Dockyard.
 Fate:  Wrecked off Great Yarmouth on 17 November 1803.
 Rose
 Ordered: 15 March 1782
 Built by: Joshua Stewart & Hall, Sandgate.
 Keel laid:  June 1782
 Launched:  1 July 1783
 Completed:  23 October 1783 at Deptford Dockyard.
 Fate:  Wrecked off Jamaica on 28 June 1794.
 Hussar
 Ordered: 26 March 1782
 Built by: Fabian, Clayton & Willson, Sandgate.
 Keel laid:  June 1782
 Launched:  1 September 1784
 Completed:  November 1787 at Deptford Dockyard.
 Fate:  Wrecked off Brittany 27 December 1796
 Alligator
 Ordered: 7 May 1782
 Built by: Philemon Jacobs, Sandgate.
 Keel laid:  December 1782
 Launched:  18 April 1787
 Completed:  18 July 1790 at Deptford Dockyard.
 Fate:  Sold at Plymouth Dockyard 21 July 1814.
 Dido
 Ordered: 5 June 1782
 Built by: Joshua Stuart & Hall, Sandgate.
 Keel laid:  September 1782
 Launched:  27 November 1784
 Completed:  October 1787 at Portsmouth Dockyard.
 Fate:  Sold at Portsmouth Dockyard on 3 April 1817.
 Lapwing
 Ordered: 22 October 1782
 Built by: Thomas King, Dover.
 Keel laid:  February 1783
 Launched:  21 September 1785
 Completed:  19 May 1791 at Woolwich Dockyard.
 Fate:  Taken to pieces at Plymouth Dockyard in May 1828.

References 
 David Lyon, The Sailing Navy List, Brasseys Publications, London 1993.
 Rif Winfield, British Warships in the Age of Sail, 1714 to 1792, Seaforth Publishing, London 2007.

External links
 

Frigate classes
Ship classes of the Royal Navy